The Mausoleum of Seyid Yahya Bakuvi was built in approximately 1457–1458, in Baku, Azerbaijan. The mausoleum is located in the centre of the middle yard of the Palace of the Shirvanshahs. Among local people it is known as the mausoleum of “dervish” and was named after the philosopher and thinker Seyid Yahya Bakuvi who is buried in it.

The mausoleum is not large. It has an octagonal prismatic form and is covered with a conic stone cupola. This form is odd for monuments of Baku and Absheron. Such kinds of constructions are met beyond Baku and partially in Shamakhi Rayon. The mausoleum is divided into two parts: overground and underground. The upper part of the mausoleum was used for accomplishment of cultic rites, but there was a burial vault. There are three small windows with stone shebeke-lattices in the southern, eastern and western facets of the mausoleum. The burial vault also has a window with shebeke-lattice. The whole mausoleum was revetted with narrow and wide rows of tightly urged to each other and finely nigged stones. Ancient ornaments in form of grid are saved within a cupola-shaped vault. Admixtures of wool fabrics strengthening the mausoleum were used in plastering of its walls. Light cuts (up to ) filled with colored mixture were made in plastering.

The mausoleum was attached to an ancient mosque known as Key-Gubad Mosque. Seyid Yahya Bakuvi worked, prayed and taught namely in this mosque. The mosque was built during Shirvansah Key Gubad's reign, in the 14th century, and was named after him. But in 1918, the mosque was burned down during a fire and only the remains of its foundation exist at present.

The Mausoleum of Seyid Yahya Bakuvi is one of the best patterns of memorial architecture of the northern regions of Azerbaijan.

References

Mausoleums in Azerbaijan
Tourist attractions in Baku
Buildings and structures in Baku
Palace of the Shirvanshahs